Mireya Rodríguez (26 November 1936 – 10 July 2007) was a Cuban fencer. She competed in the women's individual foil event at the 1964 Summer Olympics.

References

1936 births
2007 deaths
Cuban female foil fencers
Olympic fencers of Cuba
Fencers at the 1964 Summer Olympics
Sportspeople from Havana
Pan American Games medalists in fencing
Pan American Games gold medalists for Cuba
Fencers at the 1963 Pan American Games
20th-century Cuban women
21st-century Cuban women